Vexillum chocotinctum is a species of small sea snail, marine gastropod mollusk in the family Costellariidae, the ribbed miters.

Description
The length of the shell attains 25.4 mm.

Distribution
This marine species occurs off Vietnam and Papua New Guinea.

References

 Turner H. (2008) New species of the family Costellariidae from the Indian and Pacific Oceans (Gastropoda: Neogastropoda: Muricoidea). Archiv für Molluskenkunde 137(1): 105–125. [27 June 2008] page(s): 110

External links
 WMSDB: image of Vexillum chocotinctum

chocotinctum
Gastropods described in 2008